Andaz Shenzhen Bay is a  tall skyscraper in Shenzhen, Guangdong, China. The tower nearby multiple supertall skyscraper such as the China Resources Headquarters and the One Shenzhen Bay. Construction started in 2015 and was completed in 2021.

See also

China Resources Headquarters
One Shenzhen Bay
List of tallest buildings in Shenzhen

References

Skyscraper office buildings in Shenzhen
Skyscrapers in Shenzhen